Hednota urithrepta is a moth in the family Crambidae. It was described by Turner in 1925. It is found in Australia, where it has been recorded from New South Wales.

References

Crambinae
Moths described in 1925